Pinkalicious & Peterrific is an educational animated children's television series on PBS Kids, based upon the Pinkalicious book series by Victoria and Elizabeth Kann. The series is produced by Sixteen South in association with WGBH Kids.

The series premiered on February 19, 2018, with its first season of 38 episodes. PBS Kids announced the renewal of the series for a second and third season in October 2019; the second season premiered on March 30, 2020 and ended on December 7, 2020; the third season premiered on June 18, 2021 and ended on January 12, 2022. A fourth season was later announced; the fourth season premiered on September 26, 2022. Ahead of its season four premiere, PBS Kids renewed the series for a fifth season with 7 episodes and sixth and seventh seasons each with 6 episodes. The fifth season premiered on February 13, 2023.

Overview
Designed to encourage preschool-age children to explore the arts and develop their creativity, Pinkalicious & Peterrific follows the adventures of Pinkalicious and her brother Peter as they imagine how the world looks through her artful eye. Each episode consists of two 11 minute stories, including an interstitial live-action segment and an original song.

Characters

Main characters
 Pinkalicious Pinkerton (voiced by Kayla Erickson in seasons 1-3; Shazdeh Kapadia in season 4-5): An imaginative young girl who likes pink (more than any other color) in addition to soccer, painting, tinkering and using her creativity.
 Peter Pinkerton (voiced by Jaden Waldman in seasons 1-3; Logan Nicholson in season 4-5): Pinkalicious' younger brother. He likes riding his scooter, playing with blocks and tagging along on Pinkalicious' adventures. He has some angst over being the youngest, as evidenced in "No Honking" in his song, "Music to Me".
 Pearl Pinkerton (voiced by Molly Lloyd in seasons 1-3; Katie Ryerson in season 4-5): Pinkalicious and Peter's mother and inventor.
 Perry Pinkerton (voiced by Jayce Bartok in seasons 1-3; Jonathan Tan in season 4-5): Pinkalicious and Peter's father who often gives them advice.

Supporting characters
 Jasmine Cooper (voiced by Daia Johnson in seasons 1-3; Ava Augustin in season 4-5): Pinkalicious and Peter's friend. She has curly black hair in bunches held by yellow ribbons. She likes the color yellow in addition to playing the recorder.
Lila Goodway (voiced by Raleigh Shuck): Pinkalicious and Peter's friend. She has brown hair braided in twintails; she dresses in purple and plays soccer. She is a member of Pinkalicious' clique but unseen hanging out with them often due to her shy nature. She is sensitive, as shown in "Slumber Party" (missing her mom at the eponymous party) and in "Peter's Blues" (getting discouraged after Peter sings about her missing the net in soccer).
 Kendra Klee (voiced by Echo Picone in seasons 1-3; Emma Ho in season 4-5): Pinkalicious' friend. She has straight shoulder-length black hair and wears dark clothing. Her favorite color is black (the only one not to have pink as favorite color). She often makes sarcastic comments towards others but usually before she comes through in the end and goes along with Pinkalicious' ideas.
 Rafael Martinez (voiced by Justice Quiroz in seasons 1-3; Roman Pesino in season 4-season 5 episode 2; Nico Ceci in season 5 episode 3-present): Pinkalicious and Peter's friend, whose mother is Mayor Martinez (and he has a dog named Rusty). He likes to paint; even though he and Pinkalicious don't always agree, they're still friends.
 Frida Martinez (voiced by Nicole Ruiz in seasons 1-3; Alyssa Gervasi in season 4-5): Peter's friend and Rafael's younger sister.
 Mayor Martinez (voiced by Rebecca Soler in seasons 1-3; Veronica Hortiguela in season 4-5): The mayor of Pinkville and Rafael's mother.
 Mrs. Plum (voiced by Blanca Camacho): In the episode "Drawing Noses", her first name is revealed to be Richanda.
 Mr. Plum (voiced by Ezra Knight)
 Gertie (voiced by Marlo Thomas): Lila's stuffed pink dragon.
 Ms. Penny (voiced by Erin Fitzgerald): the teacher at Pinkalicious' school.
 Mr. Crunk (voiced by Chris Philips in seasons 1-3; Murray Furrow in season 5): the vice-principal at Pinkalicious' school, who thinks art is useless and also a waste of time.
 Penelope (voiced by Brittany Johnson): Johnson also voiced the garbage woman.
 Goldie: an unicorn
 The shoe salesman
 Norman (voiced by Chuck Lewkowicz): a garden gnome
 Alexis Jackson-Goodway (voiced by Addison Holley): Lila's older half-sister who Rafael has a crush on.

Episodes

Series overview

Season 1 (2018–19)

Season 2 (2020)

Season 3 (2021–22)

Season 4 (2022)

Season 5 (2023)

Specials

"A Pinkaperfect Birthday"
The first TV special aired on August 5, 2019. In the special, Pinkalicious receives a wand on her birthday that makes everything in Pinkville pink, but not everyone loved what she did. So she and Peter go on a quest to find out how to use the wand to turn everything back to normal.

"Cupid Calls It Quits"
The second TV special aired on February 8, 2021. In the special, Cupid decides to quit his job and cancel Valentine's Day until further notice, leaving Pinkalicious and Peter to fill in for him and bring back the holiday.

Merchandise

Books

To promote the series, books in the Pinkalicious series, published after the show's premiere, invite readers to watch Pinkalicious & Peterrific on PBS Kids.

Magazines
Redan's Sparkle World magazine, aimed at 3-9 year olds, featured Pinkalicious & Peterrific-related content, alongside other characters for girls including Shopkins, My Little Pony, and more.

References

External links
 
 

2010s American animated television series
2020s American animated television series
2010s British animated television series
2020s British animated television series
2018 American television series debuts
2018 British television series debuts
American children's animated adventure television series
American children's animated fantasy television series
American children's animated musical television series
American flash animated television series
American preschool education television series
American television shows based on children's books
American television series with live action and animation
Animated television series about children
Animated television series about siblings
Animated television series about families
British children's animated adventure television series
British children's animated fantasy television series
British children's animated musical television series
British flash animated television series
British preschool education television series
British television shows based on children's books
British television series with live action and animation
English-language television shows
PBS Kids shows
PBS original programming
Television series by WGBH
Animated preschool education television series
2010s preschool education television series
2020s preschool education television series
Mermaids in television